In mathematics, in the branch of complex analysis, a holomorphic function on an open subset of the complex plane  is called univalent if it is injective.

Examples
The function  is univalent in the open unit disc, as  implies that . As the second factor is non-zero in the open unit disc,  must be injective.

Basic properties

More, one has by the chain rule

for all  in

Comparison with real functions 

For real analytic functions, unlike for complex analytic (that is, holomorphic) functions, these statements fail to hold. For example, consider the function

given by ƒ(x) = x3.  This function is clearly injective, but its derivative is 0 at x = 0, and its inverse is not analytic, or even differentiable, on the whole interval (−1, 1).  Consequently, if we enlarge the domain to an open subset G of the complex plane, it must fail to be injective; and this is the case, since (for example) f(εω) = f(ε) (where ω is a primitive cube root of unity and ε is a positive real number smaller than the radius of G as a neighbourhood of 0).

See also 
 Biholomorphic mapping
 De Branges's theorem
 Koebe quarter theorem
 Riemann mapping theorem
 Schlicht function

Note

References 

Analytic functions

is:Eintæk vörpun